The National Archives and Library of Ethiopia, located in Addis Ababa, is the national library and archives of the country. The library was inaugurated in 1944 by Emperor Haile Selassie and began service with books donated by the emperor.

Overview
In 1976, proclamation No. 50/76 gave the library the legal right to collect three copies of every material published in the country. In 1999, the library was reestablished by proclamation no. 179.1999 as a national institution, which resulted in structural changes and the mission to be one of the top five national libraries and archives in Africa by 2020. It is currently a unit of the Ministry of Culture and Tourism.

The archives was established in 1979, and its collection includes ancient and historical manuscripts written from as early as the 14th and 15th centuries. It started functioning with archives from the Ministry of the Grand Palace, Palace of the Crown Prince, and others. The archive includes letters written by several kings, empresses, and princes.

See also 
 Ethiopian historiography
 Unesco Memory of the World Register – Africa
 List of national archives

Notes

References

 HRYÚKO, Katarzyna. 2007. An Outline of the National Archives and Library of Ethiopia. Aethiopica Vol. 10: 92–105.
 WION, Anaïs, "The National Archives and Library of Ethiopia: six years of Ethio-French cooperation (2001-2006)", available on Open Archive Repository HAL-SHS and to be published in the Acts of the Enno Littmann Conference, Aksum, Dec. 2005.

Bibliography
  (Includes information about the national library)

External links
Official website

Archives in Ethiopia
Ethiopian culture
Government of Ethiopia
Libraries in Ethiopia
Ethiopia
Ethiopia
Buildings and structures in Addis Ababa
Culture in Addis Ababa
Education in Addis Ababa
1944 establishments in Ethiopia
Libraries established in 1944
20th-century architecture in Ethiopia